Medical Properties Trust, Inc., based in Birmingham, Alabama, is a real estate investment trust that invests in healthcare facilities subject to NNN leases. The company owns 438 properties in the United States, Australia, Colombia, Germany, Italy, Portugal, Spain, Switzerland, Finland, and the United Kingdom.

The company owns equity interest in several healthcare providers. Current and past investments have included Steward Health Care, Capella Healthcare, Priory Group, and Ernest Health.

History
The company was founded on August 27, 2003. It went public on the New York Stock Exchange via an IPO on July 7, 2005.

In 2005, the company acquired the Northern California Rehabilitation Hospital for $20.75 million and the Chino Valley Medical Center for $21 million.

In 2012, the company acquired Ernest Health in a $400 million transaction.

In March 2016, the company merged its investment in the operations of Capella Healthcare with RegionalCare.

In October 2016, the company invested $1.25 billion in Steward Health Care System.

In May 2017, the company announced plans to invest $1.4 billion in 10 acute care hospitals and a behavioral health facility.

In August 2019 it bought eight U.K. hospitals operated by Ramsay Health Care and 16 hospitals operated by Prospect Medical Holdings. On January 8, 2020, Medical Properties Trust purchased 30 acute care hospitals in the U.K. for nearly £1.5 billion and leased them to Circle Health. Later in 2021, they completed a sale-and-leaseback transaction with Priory Group to acquire 35 U.K. mental health facilities for £800 million.

In March 2022, the company purchased four hospitals in Finland for 178 million Euros, representing its first acquisition in Scandinavia.

Controversies

In 2022, a report from Brian Spegele for The Wall Street Journal asserted that Medical Properties Trust had made multiple loans to its largest tenant Steward Health Care and paid large premiums, in some cases several million dollars, over the market value to Steward for property that Steward than leased from Medical Properties. The article alleged that this was done to help Steward pay off debts to Cerberus Capital Management, while Medical Properties claimed that the amounts paid for the properties were fair based on its internal appraisals for the properties.

Another Spegele-authored Wall Street Journal report additionally asserted that the company engaged in risky acquisitions with tenants who were likely to default on rent payments later while the compensation of executives of the company was partially linked to the volume of acquisitions they could make. The company clarified that it does not directly compensate executives for acquisition volume, and that its compensation plan provides for reducing executive compensation if acquisitions do not increase the company's per-share value.

References

External links

Real estate companies established in 2003
Financial services companies established in 2003
Companies based in Birmingham, Alabama
Investment companies of the United States
Real estate investment trusts of the United States